Michael Christopher Lovell (born April 11, 1930) is an American economist. He was the Chester D. Hubbard Professor of Economics and Social Science at Wesleyan University from 1969 to 2002, professor of economics at Carnegie-Mellon from 1963 to 1969, and assistant professor of economics at Yale from 1958 to 1963.

A native of Cambridge, Massachusetts, Lovell earned his PhD from Harvard University with a dissertation on inventories that was later published in parts in Econometrica.

Lovell's older brother Hugh Gilbert Lovell was also an economist. Their father, R. Ivan Lovell, was a professor of history at Willamette University from 1937 to 1966.

References

External links 
 Website at Wesleyan University

1930 births
Living people
Harvard University alumni
Carnegie Mellon University faculty
Wesleyan University faculty
Fellows of the Econometric Society
Willamette University faculty
Economists from Oregon